Raymond E. Jordan (April 2, 1895 – August 18, 1967) was an American politician. Between 1937 and 1939 he was lieutenant governor of the state of Rhode Island.

In 1936 Jordan was elected Lieutenant Governor of Rhode Island alongside Robert E. Quinn. He held this office between 1937 and 1939. He was Deputy Governor and Chairman of the State Senate. In 1938 he was defeated by James O. McManus. In July 1940 he participated as a delegate to the Democratic National Convention in Chicago, where President Franklin D. Roosevelt was nominated for the third time as a presidential candidate.

References

Web links
The Political Graveyard

Lieutenant Governors of Rhode Island
1895 births
1967 deaths
Rhode Island Democrats